Radke Martinez Regional Shoreline (RMRS) is a regional park on the shoreline of Carquinez Strait in Martinez, located in northern Contra Costa County, California. Formerly known as the Martinez Regional Shoreline, it was renamed on December 6, 2016, in honor of the late Ted Radke and his late wife Kathy Radke.

Features

In the eastern section of the park there are group picnic areas, softball fields, bocce ball courts, and soccer fields.

Near the shore are the remains of Forester, a 1900 schooner.

The Carquinez Strait Regional Shoreline continues to the west along Carquinez Strait, through Port Costa to Crockett and the Crockett Hills Regional Park.

See also

Notes

References

External links
 East Bay Regional Park District: official Martinez Regional Shoreline website

East Bay Regional Park District
Martinez, California
Parks in Contra Costa County, California
Carquinez Strait
San Francisco Bay Trail
Beaches of Contra Costa County, California